Hofesh (lit. "freedom"), officially Hofesh - Freedom from Religion is an Israeli organization advocating separation of religion and state and stopping the religious coercion in Israel, objecting to repentance activity and going against it. The organization is an affiliate of Atheist Alliance International.

Goals 
The organization's goals are:

 To act and support all possible ways within the law for separation of religion and state and against any manifestation of ultra-Orthodox takeover and religious coercion in all its forms, including preaching Haredization.
 To act in any way to increase the awareness of the Jewish-secular identity of the liberated public in Israel, to cooperate with public bodies, organizations, cultural institutions and websites in order to expand the basis of the liberated, liberal, pluralistic and secular worldview of Israeli society.
 To serve as framework and address for all those affected by the acts of Haredization (repentance) and religious coercion, to guide and assist families affected by preaching orthodoxy.

History 

In Israel of the 1980s, there was an activity of ultra-Orthodox and religious associations, and the phenomenon of repentance among the secular public increased. At the end of 1985, a number of parents of a teen returning in repentance began to organize as a group and locate other people like them. In May 1986, the group established an association called "Victims of Repentance" (Nifga'ey HaHazara BiTshuva), whose goals were:

 Publicly reveal the methods of the repentance advocators.
 Investigate the phenomenon of repentance and its scope.
 Stimulate public opinion in the country and expose it to the dangers lurking (in the opinion of the association) to the individual, family, society and the entire country from the process of repentance.
 Act with the state authorities, its institutions and leaders, draw their attention to the phenomenon, and prevent further repentance by stopping the flow of funds to the institutions engaged in this activity.

According to the association's website, the association succeeded in "outlawing missionary work in schools and IDF bases". In 1987, the association changed its name to "ע.ל.ה", an abbreviation in Hebrew for "Association for the Prevention of the Haredi Takeover", started dealing with issues other than repentance, such as the prevention of religious coercion and the prevention of the situation of the Halachic state in Israel.

In 1998, the association merged with Hofesh website, and changed its name to "ע.ל.ה – חופש". Since then, the association's activity has been conducted simultaneously on the web and outside of. Hofesh website was established in November 1997 and is operated by volunteers.

In September 2004, a decision was made to change the association name to "Hofesh - Freedom from Religion"

In July 2016, the association, along with a number of other petitioners, filed a petition with the Bagatz, demanding the Minister of Transportation, Israel Katz, and the Ministry of Transportation consider operating public transportation on Shabbat, in light of their refusal to operate public transportation on Shabbat.

The organization is an affiliate of Atheist Alliance International.

The organization is objectionable among the religious and Haredi public.

See also 

 Religion in Israel

References

External links 

  
  

 Hofesh on Guidestar Israel
 Eli Eshed, At the forefront of the fight against the Haredim, "The multiverse of Eli Eshed" blog 
 Amnon Rubinstein, Freeing us from the Haredim: the few issues on which there is consensus, such as the desire to free ourselves from the religious coercion, on Globes, October 18, 2020 

Political organizations based in Israel
Non-profit organizations based in Israel